Edwin Fox is one of the world's oldest surviving merchant sailing ships.<ref group=Note> Built 1849. The American whaler Charles W. Morgan, built in 1841, is arguably the oldest surviving merchant ship.</ref> The Edwin Fox is also the only surviving ship that transported convicts to Australia. She is unique in that she is the "only intact hull of a wooden deep water sailing ship built to British specifications surviving in the world outside the Falkland Islands". Edwin Fox carried settlers to both Australia and New Zealand and carried troops in the Crimean War. The ship is dry-docked at The Edwin Fox Maritime Centre at Picton in New Zealand.

Early history

She was built of teak in Calcutta in 1853 and her maiden voyage was to London via the Cape of Good Hope. She then went into service in the Crimean War as a troop ship, and later carrying passengers and cargo.

On 14 February 1856 she began her first voyage to Melbourne, Australia, carrying passengers, then moved to trading between Chinese ports. In 1858 she was chartered by the British Government as a convict ship bound for Fremantle, Western Australia.

Emigrant ship
In 1867 she was converted from a full-rigged ship to a barque, and from 1873 served on the emigrant route to New Zealand, making four voyages carrying a total of 751 settlers to the distant new colony. Conditions on board for the three-month voyage were harsh and luggage strictly limited, and several voyagers did not survive to see their new home. On arrival they often found conditions much harsher than expected, and were also faced with being cut off from family and friends in distant Europe, sometimes for life.

Lamb and coalEdwin Fox was overtaken by the age of steam, and in the 1880s she was refitted as a floating freezer hulk for the booming sheep industry in New Zealand. She was towed to Picton in the South Island on 12 January 1897 where she initially continued as a freezer ship, before being further dismembered in 1905 when converted into a coal store hulk. By this time she had long since lost her rigging and masts, and suffered holes cut in her sides and the removal of most fittings. The ship was in use until 1950, then abandoned to rot at her berth.

Preservation

In 1965 she was bought by the Edwin Fox Society for the nominal sum of one shilling. In 1967 she was towed to Shakespeare Bay where she remained for the next 20 years. After much further fundraising the ship was refloated and towed to her final home, a dry dock on the Picton waterfront. She floated in and the dock was drained to begin preservation.  in 2013 the Edwin Fox Society was recipient to A World Ship Trust Award for the preservation project, the last of its kind to be officially given out due to the winding up of The World Ship Trust, based in London.

Initially it was planned to restore the ship completely, replacing rigging and refurbishing the interior. It has since been decided that this is not practical, not only for reasons of finance but because the timbers required are no longer easily available. She is thus preserved as a hull with an adjacent informative museum, and visitors can visit two of her decks and so stand inside this atmospheric piece of history. 

The Ship and Museum were taken over by the newly formed Marlborough Heritage Trust (supported by local council) in 2015 in order to help safe guard her for future generations.

A book, Teak and Tide was released in 2014.

In 2015 Neil Oliver and the BBC Coast Show filmed the story of the ship for the New Zealand Coast Show.

3D Scanning of the ship took place in 2016 which has recorded the hull to within 1mm of its actual size and shape and it is hoped that a virtual restoration of the ship can be achieved at some point.

Most visitors to New Zealand will pass through Picton as they move between the islands, pre covid visitors were due to hit 13,000 for the year boosted by Hall of Fame Status from TripAdvisor. There are high hopes that the continual cost of her preservation can be met by revenue from the visitor centre. The trust is also looking for sponsors to continue their work on this unique vessel.

She has been given a category I registration from Heritage New Zealand.

See also
Thomas Bushell, a convict transported on Edwin Fox''
Convict era of Western Australia
List of convict ship voyages to Western Australia
List of museum ships

Notes

Citations

References

External links
 https://www.edwinfoxship.nz/
 
 "The Edwin Fox, Picton, New Zealand" from H2G2

 

Convict ships to Western Australia
Tall ships of Australia
Museum ships in New Zealand
Museums in the Marlborough Region
Picton, New Zealand
Ships preserved in museums
Heritage New Zealand Category 1 historic places in the Marlborough Region